Robin John Popplestone (9 December 1938 in Bristol – 14 April 2004 in Glasgow) was a pioneer in the fields of machine intelligence and robotics. He is known for developing the COWSEL and POP programming languages, and for his work on Freddy II with Pat Ambler at the University of Edinburgh Artificial Intelligence laboratory.

Biography
Robin Popplestone was born in Bristol in 1938, but after WWII his family moved to Belfast. He received an honours degree in mathematics from Queen's University Belfast in 1960. He started a PhD at Manchester University before moving to Leeds University. His project was to develop a program for automated theorem proving, but he got caught up in using the university computer to design a boat. He built the boat and set sail for the University of Edinburgh, where he had been offered a research position. A storm hit while crossing the North Sea, and the boat sank. A widely believed story about Popplestone was that he never completed his PhD in mathematics because he lost his thesis manuscript in the boat, although Popplestone refused to corroborate this. The early part of his professional career was spent at the University of Edinburgh (1965-1985) and the later part at the University of Massachusetts Amherst (1985-2001). In 1990, he was elected a Founding Fellow of the Association for the Advancement of Artificial Intelligence. Due to illness, he retired in 2001 to the Glasgow area. He died in 2004 after a 10-year illness with prostate cancer.

References

External links
 
 A remembrance of Robin Popplestone
 Popplestones' books at archive.org.

Scientists from Bristol
1938 births
2004 deaths
British computer scientists
British roboticists
Academics of the University of Edinburgh
History of computing in the United Kingdom
University of Massachusetts Amherst faculty
British sailors
Deaths from prostate cancer
Fellows of the Association for the Advancement of Artificial Intelligence
Single-handed sailors